Bjarni Jónsson (February 15, 1920 – September 30, 2016) was an Icelandic mathematician and logician working in universal algebra, lattice theory, model theory and set theory. He was emeritus distinguished professor of mathematics at Vanderbilt University and the honorary editor in chief of Algebra Universalis. He received his PhD in 1946 at UC Berkeley under supervision of Alfred Tarski.

In 2012, he became a fellow of the American Mathematical Society.

Work
Jónsson's lemma as well as several mathematical objects are named after him, among them Jónsson algebras, ω-Jónsson functions, Jónsson cardinals, Jónsson terms, Jónsson–Tarski algebras and Jónsson–Tarski duality.

Publications

References

Further reading
 Kirby A. Baker, Bjarni Jónsson's contributions in algebra, Algebra Universalis, September 1994, Volume 31, Issue 3, pp. 306–336.
 J. B. Nation, Jónsson's contributions to lattice theory, Algebra Universalis, September 1994, Volume 31, Issue 3, pp. 430–445.

External links
Bjarni Jónsson's homepage

1920 births
Bjarni Jonsson
Algebraists
Lattice theorists
20th-century mathematicians
University of California, Berkeley alumni
Vanderbilt University faculty
Fellows of the American Mathematical Society
Bjarni Jonsson
Tarski lecturers
2016 deaths

Brown University faculty
Icelandic expatriates in the United States